This is a list of films produced in, set in, or related to the Dominican Republic, in chronological order.

1920s

1930s

1940s

1950s

1960s

1970s

1980s

1990s

2000s

2010s

References

External links

 Films with the country of origin as the Dominican Republic: Dominican films at the Internet Movie Database
 Films with the location in the Dominican Republic: Dominican films at the Internet Movie Database

Lists of films by country of production
Cinema of the Dominican Republic
Films
Dominican Republic culture
Films shot in the Dominican Republic
Films set in the Dominican Republic